Reggie Verghese was a well-known Singaporean musician and record producer, known as Singapore's first guitar hero of the 1960s. During the 1960s, he was a member of The Quests. He later moved into production, producing work for acts such as Matthew and the Mandarins, Frankie Cheah, Anita Sarawak, Western Union Band, Jennifer Yen and Tracy Huang.

Career
Around 1963, while still in secondary school, he was a member of a group called The Checkmates.
In 1964, the guitarist for The Quests, Raymond Leong who had left the group to pursue studies. Verghese took his place. In a matter of months, the group had a no.1 hit with" Shanty". His guitar playing in the song attracted a lot of attention. Along with Jap Chong, sharing the vocals, he stayed with the group throughout all of the line up changes until the group's break up in 1971. He then moved into production.

Production
In 1977, he produced the debut album for The Western Union Band which had evolved out of a 1960s group called The Rubber Band. The album, a self-titled album contained the songs "Sausolito" and "Howzit". He produced the self-titled album for Matthew & The Mandarins which was released on EMI and contained the song "Singapore Cowboy". The song would eventually become a big hit in Singapore, reaching no. 1. He also produced their next album II which was released in 1979, also on EMI.

Death
Having suffered  had heart and liver problems for a few years, Verghese died of heart failure in Khoo Teck Puat Hospital on Wednesday June 17, 2015.

Discography

References

Singaporean guitarists
Singaporean rock guitarists
Singaporean musicians
Singaporean songwriters
Singaporean record producers
2015 deaths